Patriarch Michael II may refer to:

 Patriarch Michael II of Alexandria, Greek Patriarch of Alexandria in 870–903
 Michael II of Constantinople, Ecumenical Patriarch in 1143–1146
 Patriarch Michael II of Antioch, head of the Syriac Orthodox Church in 1292–1312
 Patriarch Michael II Fadel, ruled in 1793–1795